Oligernis is a genus of moths of the family Crambidae. It contains only one species, Oligernis endophthalma, which is found on Borneo.

References

Natural History Museum Lepidoptera genus database

Acentropinae
Taxa named by Edward Meyrick
Monotypic moth genera
Moths of Asia
Crambidae genera